The Shiloh wind power plant is a wind farm located in the Montezuma Hills of Solano County, California, USA, close to Bird's Landing and Collinsville, 40 miles (64 km) northeast of San Francisco.  It has a nameplate capacity of 505 megawatts (MW) of power and was built in four stages between 2005 and 2012. Several additional projects are also located in the Montezuma.

Overview

Shiloh I 
PPM Energy acquired the project, which had already received all the required permits, from enXco in May 2005. Construction started in August 2005 and completed in April 2006. The first phase of the wind farm consists of 100 GE 1.5 MW wind turbines. The turbines are owned by Iberdrola Renewables (formerly known as PPM Energy) and the electricity is sold to Pacific Gas and Electric (75 MW), the Modesto Irrigation District (50 MW), and the City of Palo Alto (25 MW).

The land for the turbines is leased from 26 local landowners, who continue to use it for sheep grazing and growing hay.

Shiloh II 
The wind farm has 75 REpower MM92 turbines, each generating up to 2 megawatts. It produces enough energy for 74,000 homes. EnXco has a 20-year contract to sell the power to Pacific Gas and Electric Co.

Shiloh III 
The Shiloh III project went online in early 2012 with fifty REpower 2.05 MW turbines, generating 102.5 MW. The power is sold to Pacific Gas and Electric Company under a 20-year agreement.

Shiloh IV 
Shiloh IV became operational in December 2012, and like Shiloh III, consists of fifty REpower 2.05 MW turbines, generating 102.5 MW.  The power is sold to Pacific Gas and Electric Company under a 25-year purchase agreement.  Shiloh IV involved removal of about 235 existing Kenetech 100 kW turbines, originally installed in 1989 with a capacity of 25 MW. This wind farm has a permit from the U.S. Fish and Wildlife Service which allows for the death of 5 eagles per 5 years because of a collision with a turbine, without facing the penalties outlined by the Bald and Golden Eagle Protection Act. The permit outlines the requirements of the project owner to minimize and offset those eagle deaths with the goal of no-net loss to the eagle population.

References

External links

Energy infrastructure completed in 2006
Energy infrastructure completed in 2009
Wind farms in California
Buildings and structures in Solano County, California
Energy in the San Francisco Bay Area
2006 establishments in California